Events in the year 2023 in Germany.

Incumbents
President: Frank-Walter Steinmeier 
Chancellor: Olaf Scholz

Events
 5 January – The United States and Germany agree to send Bradley Fighting Vehicles and Marder infantry fighting vehicles to Ukraine. Germany will also supply the Ukrainian military with a MIM-104 Patriot surface-to-air missile system.
 8 January – North Rhine-Westphalia Police arrest two Iranian brothers in Castrop-Rauxel, Ruhr, North Rhine-Westphalia, on the suspicion of planning an Islamic terrorist attack using chemical weapons.
 16 January – German Defence Minister Christine Lambrecht resigns from the Scholz cabinet amid criticism over her handling of the war in Ukraine.
 22 January – German Foreign Affairs Minister Annalena Baerbock says that Germany will not prevent Poland from sending Leopard 2 main battle tanks to Ukraine which Ukrainian officials say are pivotal to defeating Russian forces on the battlefield.
 24 January – German Chancellor Olaf Scholz decides to send Leopard 2 main battle tanks to Ukraine, and will allow other operators of the tanks, such as Poland, to do so as well.
 25 January – Two people are killed and seven others are wounded in a mass stabbing on a passenger train in Brokstedt, Steinburg, Schleswig-Holstein.
 10 February – At least 35 people are injured when a bus overturns near Magdeburg, Saxony-Anhalt.
 12 February – 2023 Berlin repeat state election
 22 February – Germany expels two employees of the Iranian embassy in response to Iran sentencing pro-monarchist dual German-Iranian Jamshid Sharmahd to death over a 2008 bombing in Iran.
 9 March – A mass shooting in Hamburg kills six people and injures eight others. The gunman then commits suicide.
 9–11 March – Last meeting of Synodal Path in Frankfurt am Main

Predicted and scheduled
 14 May: 2023 Bremen state election
 8 October: 2023 Bavarian state election
 2023 Hessian state election

Deaths

January 
 1 January – Bob Jongen, 95, German-born Dutch footballer. (born 1927)
 2 January – Kurt Horres, 90, theatre director. (born 1932)
 3 January – Norbert Werbs, 82, Roman Catholic prelate and theologian, auxiliary bishop of Schwerin (1981–1994) and Hamburg (1994–2015). (born 1940)
 4 January – 
 Rosi Mittermaier, 72, ski racer (born 1950)
 Hans Rebele, 79, footballer (1860 Munich, West Germany national team).
 5 January – 
 Ruth Adler Schnee, 99, German-born American textile and interior designer.
 Renate Boy, 83, shot putter, Olympic silver medallist (1964).
 6 January – Axel Troost, 68, politician, MP (2005–2017, 2021).
 8 January – Siegfried Kurz, 92, conductor and composer.
 9 January –
 Rainer Ulrich, 73, footballer (Karlsruher SC) and coach (SSV Ulm, VfR Mannheim).
 Thomas Kretschmer, 68, politician, member of the Landtag of Thuringia (1990–2008).
 Hermann-Josef Blanke, 65, academic and legal scholar.
 10 January – 
 Lothar Blumhagen, 95, film and voice actor.
 Hans Belting, 87, art historian.
 11 January – 
 Tatjana Patitz, 56, model and actress.
 Günther Deschner, 81, author and historian.
 14 January –
 Matthias Carras, 58, pop singer.
 Carl Hahn, 96, automotive industry executive, chairman of Volkswagen Group (1982–1993).
 Hermann A. Schlögl, 85, actor and Egyptologist.
 17 January – Heinz-Dieter Hasebrink, 81, footballer (Rot-Weiss Essen, 1. FC Kaiserslautern, Werder Bremen).
 18 January – Clytus Gottwald, 97, composer, conductor and musicologist.
 20 January – Hans Kasper, 84, politician, member of the Landtag of Saarland (1970–1999).
 22 January – Bernd Uhl, 76, Roman Catholic prelate, auxiliary bishop of Freiburg (2001–2018).
 23 January – Inge Kaul, 78, economist.
 25 January – Wolfgang Altenburg, 94, general, inspector general of the Bundeswehr (1983–1986) and chairman of the NATO Military Committee (1986–1989).
 26 January – Sepp Dürr, 69, politician, member of the Landtag of Bavaria (1998–2018).
 27 January – Hellmut Mehnert, 94, internist and diabetologist.
 29 January –
 Gerhard Moehring, 101, teacher and local historian.
 Gero Storjohann, 64, politician.
 Gerhard Woitzik, 95, politician.
30 January – Gerald Mortag, 64, cyclist, Olympic silver medallist (1980).

February 
2 February –
Solomon Perel, 97, German-born Israeli author and motivational speaker (Europa Europa).
Caspar Richter, 78, conductor (Vereinigte Bühnen Wien).
3 February –
Andreas Gielchen, 58, footballer (1. FC Köln, Alemannia Aachen).
Ismail Tipi, 64, Turkish-German politician, member of the Landtag of Hesse (since 2010).
4 February – Jürgen Flimm, 81, theater director and manager (Salzburg Festival, Berlin State Opera).
10 February – Hans Modrow, 95, politician
16 February – Tim Lobinger, 50, pole vaulter
16 February – Tony Marshall, 85, singer
16 February – Gunnar Heinsohn, 79, author, sociologist and economist 
25 February – Corinna Miazga, 39, politician
26 February – Günther von Lojewski, 87, journalist

March 
2 March – Mary Bauermeister, 89, artist
4 March – Heinz Baumann, 95, actor
5 March – Klaus-Michael Bonsack, 79, luger
6 March – Traute Lafrenz, 103, resistance fighter
6 March – Heinz Schwarz, 94, politician

References

 
Germany
Germany
2020s in Germany
Years of the 21st century in Germany